Mimusops andamanensis is a species of plant in the family Sapotaceae. It is native to Sri Lanka and the Andaman Islands.

References

External links
Oldfield, S., Lusty, C. and MacKinven, A. 1998: The World List of Threatened Trees. World Conservation Press, Cambridge, UK.
Anonymous 2007: The 2007 red list of threatened flora and fauna of Sri Lanka. IUCN and MENR, Sri Lanka.
Balakrishnan, N. P. and Vasudeva Rao M. K. 1983: (in Jain, S. K. & R. R. Rao, An assessment of threatened plants of India) The dwindling plant species of the Andaman and Nicobar Islands 186 – 201.
Mathew, S. P., C. K. Biju & H. Biju 2015:  Phytogeography of lesser known Mimusops andamanensis King & Gamble (Sapotaceae) with special reference to its occurrence in Little Andaman Island. . International Journal of Advanced Research 3:1127 – 1131.
Mathew, S. P. and C. R. Chitra 2015: Propagation and ex-situ conservation of mimusops andamanensis king & gamble (sapotaceae) - a critically endangered species from Andaman-Nicobar islands and Sri Lanka. Research Journal of Agriculture and Environmental Management 4 (10) : 470–474.

andamanensis
Flora of Sri Lanka
Flora of the Andaman Islands